The Auto Four is a motorcycle designed and built by engineer and motorcycle enthusiast Wild Bill Gelbke during the early 1970s. Approximately seven examples were built. Gelbke, who had attended engineering school in Wisconsin and at University of Southern California, had worked for McDonnell Douglas and also owned two motorcycle shops in Chicago and Hammond, Indiana. After building his Roadog bike during the 1960s, he wanted to create a more practical large motorcycle for touring and police needs that could go into regular production. As with Roadog, Gelbe constructed and welded the frame himself using 4130 chrome-molybdenum tubing. The bikes were equipped with a BMC A-Series engine and General Motors 4-speed automatic transmission. While the frame and body were custom built by Gelbke, electrical parts, such as headlights and taillights, were sourced from General Motors vehicles, for example the taillights from a 1959 Cadillac. Suspension was sourced from Harley Davidson, particularly hydraglide front forks. 

References 

Motorcycles introduced in the 1970s
Motorcycles designed by Wild Bill Gelbke